Salamu Sultanovich Mezhidov (born 10 February 1981 in Argun, Chechnya) is a Russian judoka.

Achievements

External links
 
 

1981 births
Living people
Russian male judoka
Judoka at the 2004 Summer Olympics
Judoka at the 2008 Summer Olympics
Olympic judoka of Russia
Chechen people
Chechen martial artists
Russian people of Chechen descent
Sportspeople from Chechnya
21st-century Russian people